"Neighborhood Superstar" is a song by American rappers DaBaby and YoungBoy Never Broke Again, released on February 25, 2022 as the second single from their collaborative mixtape Better than You (2022).

Composition
The song contains a "heavy-hitting" beat and a hook from NBA YoungBoy. The rappers use a "street-oriented approach" from, rapping about overcoming conflict and their enemy gangs.

Charts

References

2022 singles
2022 songs
DaBaby songs
YoungBoy Never Broke Again songs
Songs written by DaBaby
Songs written by YoungBoy Never Broke Again
Atlantic Records singles
Interscope Records singles